CD'87 is the third greatest hits album by Japanese singer Akina Nakamori. It was released on 1 May 1987 under Warner Pioneer. This greatest hits includes smash-hit single Desire, the second best sold single in 1986 which has rewarded multiple awards.

Background
This special compilation album was released as a celebration to her fifth debut anniversary. In the same period of time, Nakamori has received an award for The Artist of The Year in the Japan Gold Disc Award.

It consist of three singles released in 1986 and one single released in 1987. Beside the leading single track, it also consists of their b-side tracks.

Cassette-tape only single Nonfiction Ecstasy was not recorded in this compilation album, instead it was included in the compilation album Best II. Later in 1988, the leading single tracks were recorded in the third compilation album Best II.

Promotion

Singles
Desire is her fourteenth single, released on 3 February 1986. Desire became her first song to be promoted in the television commercial, for the Pioneer media player "PRIVATE CD 500AV". The single debuted at number 1 on Oricon Single Weekly Charts and became the second best sold single in 1986. In the Best Ten ranking, it debuted on number 1 for consecutive seven week and stayed at number 2 in the yearly chart. It received numerous awards: 28th Japan Record Awards, 19th Japan Cable Awards, 12th Nippon Television Music Festival, 1st Japan Gold Disc Award for the Best Single of Year and 13th FNS Music Festival.

Gypsy Queen is her fifteenth single, released on 26 May 1986. The single debuted at number 1 on Oricon Single Weekly Chart and became the seventh best sold single in 1986. In the Best Ten ranking, it debuted on number 1 and stayed at number 14 in the yearly chart. It has received two awards: 19th Japan Record Sales Award Grand Prize and 5th Megapolis Kayousai.

Fin is her sixteenth single, released on 25 September 1986. In the early announcement of the release of new studio album Fushigi, both Fin and b-side track Abunai Mor Amour were listed as candidates for inclusion, as the result they were released in this compilation album. The single debuted at number 1 on Oricon Single Weekly Chart and became the twenty-fifth best sold single in 1986. In the Best Ten ranking, it debuted on number 1 and stayed at number 17 in the yearly chart. It has received several awards: 19th Japan Record Sales Award Grand Prize and 17th Japan Music Awards .

Tango Noir is the seventeenth single released on 4 February 1987. The single debuted at number 1 on Oricon Single Weekly Chart and became the second best sold single in 1987. n the Best Ten ranking, it debuted on number 1 and stayed at number 18 in the yearly chart. It has received 2nd Japan Gold Disc Award as the Best Single Of the Year, 14th Yokohama Ongakusai and 20th Nihon Yuusen Housou Taishou.

Stage performance
La Boheme is very popular among the fans, Nakamori performed it often in her live tours and music television programs as well. Abunai Mor Amoure has been performed in NHK music television program as well.

Charting performance
The compilation album debuted at number 1 on the Oricon Weekly Album Charts and remained in the same position for two consecutive weeks. It charted for seventeen weeks and sold 159,000 copies.

Track listing

References

1987 compilation albums
Akina Nakamori albums
Japanese-language compilation albums
Warner Music Japan compilation albums